Satha II or Barom Reachea X (1702–1749), born Ang Chee, was a Cambodian king in the 18th century (r. 1722–1736, 1749).

Satha II was a son of Ang Em. He ascended the throne in 1722. In 1736, Thommo Reachea III came back to Cambodia, and drove out him. Satha II sought refuge in Saigon.

In 1749, a civil war broke out in Cambodia. With the help of Vietnamese army, Satha II came back to Cambodia. However, he was drove out by Ang Sngoun. He died in Vietnam in the same year.

References

 Achille Dauphin-Meunier Histoire du Cambodge P.U.F Paris 1968.
 Anthony Stokvis, Manuel d'histoire, de généalogie et de chronologie de tous les États du globe, depuis les temps les plus reculés jusqu'à nos jours, préf. H. F. Wijnman, Israël, 1966, Chapitre XIV §.9 « Kambodge » Listes et  tableau généalogique n°34  p. 337-338. 
 Peter Truhart, Regents of Nations, K.G Saur Münich, 1984-1988 , Art. « Kampuchea », p. 1732.

1702 births
1749 deaths
18th-century Cambodian monarchs